AOKOHIO is the sixth studio album by American band Why?. It was released by Joyful Noise Recordings on August 9, 2019. It was released with an accompanying visual album.

AOKOHIO received a 67/100 on Metacritic, signifying generally favorable reviews. Pitchfork rated the album 5.3/10, describing it as overly experimental and lacking the appeal of Why?'s early albums.

Track listing

Personnel 
Credits adapted from Tidal.

Why?
 Yoni Wolf – vocals, bass, drums, piano, sampling, producer, engineer, mixing, artwork
 Doug McDiarmid – bass, cuts, piano, synthesizer, engineer
 Matt Meldon – guitar, sounds
 Josiah Wolf – drums, bass samples, guitar, percussion, piano, sampling, producer, engineer, mixing

Additional personnel

 Grace Weir – cello, artwork
 Kate Wakefield – cello
 David McDonnell – contrabass clarinet, contra-alto clarinet, saxophone, engineer, artwork
 Andrew Broder – cuts, sampling, synthesizer
 Joe Westerlund – drums
 Nick Sanborn – drums, sampling, engineer
 Jonnie Walker – guitar, sampling, saxophone, synthesizer
 Miles Joris-Peyrafitte – sampling
 Stephen Gurewitz – sampling
 Adam Schatz – saxophone, engineer
 Peter Foley – synthesizer, engineer
 Collin Thompson – trombone
 Ofir Klemperer – trombone
 Claire Whitcomb – viola, violin
 Becky Wolf – vocals
 Christian Lee Hutson – vocals
 David Cohn – vocals, engineer
 Felix Walworth – vocals
 Gabby Smith – vocals, engineer
 Gia Margaret – vocals
 Lillie West – vocals, engineer
 Liz Wolf – vocals
 Marty Mars – vocals, mixing
 Oliver Kalb – vocals, engineer
 Pete Lyman – mastering, engineer
 Josh Berg – mixing
 Dave Vettraino – engineer
 Marshall Vore – engineer
 Nicholas Papaleo – engineer
 David Woodruff – artwork

References 

2019 albums
Joyful Noise Recordings albums
Why? (American band) albums